Chinese Man is a French trip hop band formed in 2004 and originally from Aix-en-Provence.

History
They are influenced by hip-hop, funk, dub, reggae and jazz.

Chinese Man is composed of DJ Marseille Zé Mateo and High Ku and beatmaker SLY. Beatmakers Leo le Bug and Le Yan also revolve around the group and participate in the composition of several pieces. Frequent live additions to the crew include Taiwan MC, MC Youthstar and ASM (Green T & FP). The audiovisual content for which they are well-known is produced by Fred&Annabelle, and VYZ Team. The group's song "I've Got That Tune" was chosen by Mercedes-Benz for its promotional campaign and by the 35th French Film Festival in Hong Kong as its theme.

Chinese Man Records is a label run by the band, based in Marseille, France.

Culture
The group has explained that Chinese Man is the name of the first track the collective produced together in 2004. The track got its name from a vocal sample saying Chinese Man, and they kept that name for the band and for the related label Chinese Man Records (aka CMR).

Discography

Albums
2005 : The Bootlegs Sessions
2007 : The Groove Sessions Volume 1
2009 : The Groove Sessions Volume 2
2011 : Racing with the Sun
2012 : Remix with the Sun
 "The Mourning Son" (feat. Jeru the Damaja)
 "One Past" (OBF Remix)
 "Saudade" (feat. Femi Kuti / Liliboy)
 "Stand!" extended version (feat. Plex Rock)
 "Racing with the Sun" (Deluxe Remix)
 "Down" (Scratch Bandits Crew Remix): used by "Le Before" of Le Grand Journal of Canal + in its Title sequence
 "In My Room" (feat. Chali 2Na)
 "Get up" (feat. Lush One / Plex Rock / Ex-I) (LeYan & Tomapam Remix)
 "Ta Bom" (feat. Tumi / General Electriks)
 "Miss Chang" (feat. Taiwan MC / Cyph4) (Tha Trickaz Remix)
 Racing with the Sun (Iration Steppas Remix)
 "In My Room" (DJ Suv Remix)
 "The King" (The Libra Priest Suite) (DJ Simbad Remix)
2012 : Live à la Cigale
2014 : The Groove Sessions Volume 3
2015 : Sho-Bro
2015 : The Journey
2017 : Shikantaza
 "Shikantaza"
 "Liar" (feat. Kendra Morris & Dillon Cooper)
 "Maläd"
 "Step Back"
 "The New Crown" (feat. A-F-R-O, A.S.M & Taiwan MC)
 "Escape"
 "Stone Cold" (feat. Mariama)
 "Modern Slave" (feat. R.A. The Rugged Man)
 "Warriors"
 "What You You Need" (feat Vinnie Dewayne, Myke Bogan & Tre Redeau)
 "Wolf"
 "Blah!" (feat Youthstar, Taiwan MC & Illaman)
 "Golden Age"
 "L'aurore"
 "Anvoyé"
 "Goodnight"
2020 : The Groove Sessions Volume 5

Maxi vinyls Chinese Man
 2004 : The Pandi Groove EP, 4 tracks
 2006 : The Bunni Groove EP, 6 tracks including "I've Got That Tune"
 2007 : The Indi Groove EP, 5 tracks
 2008 : The Groove Sessions Vol.1, 14 tracks
 2009 : Hong Kong Dragon Speaking EP, 4 tracks
 2009 : The Groove Sessions Vol.2, 16 tracks
 2011 : Miss Chang EP, 4 tracks
 2012 : Racing + Remix with the Sun, 26 tracks
 2014 : Once Upon a Time EP
 2014 : The Groove Sessions Vol.3, 14 tracks

Maxi vinyls solos (label Chinese Man Records)
  2008 : SLY - Small City Music EP, 8 tracks
  2008 : Leo Le Bug - Le Pudding EP, 4 tracks
  2010 : Leo Le Bug / LeYan - Split EP, 8 tracks
  2012 : Deluxe - Polishing Peanuts, 6 tracks
  2013 : Deluxe - Daniel, 4 tracks
  2013 : Deluxe - The Deluxe Family Show, 12 tracks
  2013 : LeYan & TomaPam - Sputnik Moment, 45T 2 tracks

References

External links
 
 

French hip hop groups
Trip hop groups
Electro swing musicians
Musical groups from Provence-Alpes-Côte d'Azur